Vlastimil Horváth (born 18 October 1977 in Čerčany) is a Czech singer and winner of the second  Česko hledá SuperStar show. He is of Roma origin.

Discography
Albums
Česko hledá SuperStar Top 12 (June 2005)
Místo zázraků (October 2005)
Do peří nefoukej (November 2006)

Singles
Co tě napadá
Adios

References

External links
 

1977 births
Living people
Czech Romani people
Czech television personalities
Idols (TV series) winners
Romani musicians
Czech musicians
People from Benešov District